Darren M. Swain is an American politician, a Democrat and a former member of the Maryland House of Delegates.

Background
Swain was born in Windsor North Carolina, the son of Dorothy Swain. Ms. Swain got a job with the Federal Judiciary and moved her family to the Washington suburbs. Swain then attended the Prince George's County schools, graduating from Parkdale High School, in Riverdale (now renamed Riverdale Park), Maryland in 1988. He then attended Bowie State University where he earned a bachelor's and a master's degree.

In the legislature
After the removal of Delegate Tiffany Alston, Governor O'Malley appointed Swain to fill the vacancy.

References

Democratic Party members of the Maryland House of Delegates
Living people
1970 births
People from Windsor, North Carolina
People from Riverdale Park, Maryland
Bowie State University alumni
21st-century American politicians